The Tago's brown frog or simply Tago frog (Rana tagoi) is a species of frog in the family Ranidae endemic to Japan. It is widely distributed within Japan and found on Honshu, Shikoku, and Kyushu, as well as on some outlying islands. There are two subspecies:
 Rana tagoi okiensis — Oki Islands
 Rana tagoi yakushimensis — Yakushima
These might qualify as species. It can also introgres with its sister species, Rana sakuraii.

Habitat
These frogs are found in montane areas close to streams in the leaf-litter, or underneath stones in the streams.

References

Rana (genus)
Amphibians described in 1928
Endemic amphibians of Japan
Taxonomy articles created by Polbot
Taxa named by Katsuya Tago